The Greater Antillean pewee has been split into three species:
 Cuban pewee, 	Contopus caribaeus
 Hispaniolan pewee, 	Contopus hispaniolensis
 Jamaican pewee, 	  Contopus pallidus

Animal common name disambiguation pages